Atelopus orcesi is a species of frog in the family Bufonidae. It has not been seen since 1988, and is believed to be possibly extinct.

Taxonomy

Atelopus orcesi was first described in 2010. Its specific epithet honors Gustavo Edmundo Orcés Villagómez, a pioneering Ecuadoran zoologist.

Description

Atelopus orcesi is a medium-sized member of its genus, with males averaging 30mm in length and females averaging 40mm. Males and females can also be distinguished from each other by the longer, more slender forelegs females possess, and the distinct rows of warts down the sides of the males. Both sexes possess distinct X-shaped marks on the back of their heads.

Habitat and Distribution

The species is only known from its type locality, in the eastern portion of Cordillera Occidental (Ecuador) in the Sucumbíos Province in Ecuador. Its preferred habitat consists of montane cloud forest.

History and Conservation 

The only known specimens of Atelopus orcesi were collected in May of 1988 by Ana María Velasco. No further individuals have been seen since then despite surveys, including an intensive survey at the species' type locality in 2009. It's believed that its main threats are climate change and disease.  Chytridiomycosis is not known to have played a role in the population decline of Atelopus orcesi, but it is known to have caused other populations of amphibians in Ecuador to decrease dramatically.  In 2018, the IUCN listed the species as Critically Endangered and possibly extinct.

References

orcesi
Amphibians of Ecuador
Endemic fauna of Ecuador
Amphibians described in 2010
Taxa named by Luis Aurelio Coloma
Taxa named by William Edward Duellman